Murex coppingeri is a species of large predatory sea snail, a marine gastropod mollusk in the family Muricidae, the rock snails or murex snails.

Distribution
This species occurs in the Arafura Sea.

References

External links
 Smith, E. A. (1884). Mollusca. pp. 34-116; 487-508 in: Report on the zoological collections made in the Indo-Pacific Ocean during the voyage of H. M. S. Alert 1881-2. Part I. The collections from Melanesia; Part II. Collections from the western Indian Ocean. London: The Trustees [of the British Museum (Natural History). xxv, 684 pp., 54 plates.]

Murex